Péter Szakály (born 17 August 1986) is a Hungarian football midfielder.

Club career

Debrecen
Szakály won the 2009–10 season of the Hungarian League with Debrecen despite his team lost to Kecskeméti TE in the last round. In 2010 Debrecen beat Zalaegerszegi TE in the Hungarian Cup final in the Puskás Ferenc Stadium by 3–2.

On 1 May 2012 Szakály won the Hungarian Cup with Debrecen by beating MTK Budapest on penalty shoot-out in the 2011–12 season. This was the fifth Hungarian Cup trophy for Debrecen.

On 12 May 2012 Szakály won the Hungarian League title with Debrecen after beating Pécs in the 28th round of the Hungarian League by 4–0 at the Oláh Gábor út Stadium which resulted the sixth Hungarian League title for the Hajdús.
In January 2017, he left Debrecen, after 9 years period. In this club he played 211 matches and scored 42 goals.

Puskas Akademia
He signed contract with Puskas Akademia in March 2017. Contract ended in June 2019 and Szakaly left club.

Club statistics

Updated to games played as of 27 June 2020.

Honours
Debrecen
 Hungarian League (4): 2009, 2010, 2012, 2014
 Hungarian Cup (2): 2010, 2012

National team
On 1 June 2012 Szakály debuted in the Hungarian national team against the Czech Republic. The final result was 2–1 to Hungary. In all he played six matches with national team between 2012 and 2014.

Personal life
His younger brother, Dénes Szakály, is also a footballer.

References

www.dvsc.hu
www.hlsz.hu

1986 births
People from Nagyatád
Sportspeople from Somogy County
Living people
Hungarian footballers
Hungary international footballers
Hungary under-21 international footballers
Hungary youth international footballers
Association football midfielders
Kaposvári Rákóczi FC players
Debreceni VSC players
Puskás Akadémia FC players
Újpest FC players
Nemzeti Bajnokság I players
Nemzeti Bajnokság II players